Ngatai Lynette Manning (also known as Mellory Manning) was murdered in Christchurch, New Zealand, on 18 December 2008. Manning was picked up from Manchester Street and presumably taken to a property in Avonside and brutally killed by stabbing, strangling and assault with a metal pole. Her body was then dumped in the nearby Avon River and found the next morning by a kayaker. In March 2012 a 24-year-old man was arrested and charged with the murder and abduction of Manning. He was later convicted of her murder, however this conviction was overturned on appeal and the charge was later dismissed.

Previously, the case's severity and longevity had led police to fear of a repeat killer, and a reward on information was issued. Following the arrest police acknowledged there were more people involved than the man in custody and the investigation would be ongoing.

Background
Manning had a difficult upbringing. Her father left the family when she and her siblings were young and they then had a unkind stepfather. At the age of 14, she left school after going into foster care because she was misbehaving, and became an intravenous drug user. She began working as a prostitute at 15. In 1999, she was sentenced to 18 months jail for stabbing a shop assistant with a blood-filled syringe during a robbery. She spent several periods in prison.

Her elder sister Jasmine, who "ran in similar circles", entered witness protection and lost contact with Manning, then killed herself in July 2008. Manning gave up prostitution and joined a methadone treatment programme to get off opioids, as she feared she would die young like her sister. Manning inquired about going to a polytechnic to study art, she went to live with her mother, and she and her partner planned to have a child. However, Manning's poverty and unemployment made her unable to afford Christmas presents for her family, and she returned to street prostitution for "just one night". In the days or hours before her death, she took methadone, morphine, diazepam, possibly temazepam, and THC, the active ingredient in cannabis.

Homicide
On the evening of 18 December 2008 Manning hitchhiked from Riccarton suburb to central Christchurch. A client picked her up at 9:30 pm from her usual spot at the corner of Manchester and Peterborough Streets and dropped her back there. Manning then had another client which lasted until 10:20 pm. She was then picked up at 10:35 or 10:40 pm. Another street prostitute testified that members of the Mongrel Mob gang were standing over prostitutes in central Christchurch that night, demanding $20 from each job, as they "owned the street". Manning's body was discovered by a kayaker in the Avon River at Avonside at about 6:50 am the next morning.

Investigation
Manning's watch had stopped at 11 o'clock, due to water damage. The initial investigation by police was hindered by bad weather and rain. Police confirmed that more than one weapon was behind Manning's death. The police interviewed more than 900 people and learned of a dark Ford Falcon that may have been involved. They also obtained Manning's client list, receiving a list of 40 people they were eager to speak to. The police took DNA evidence from a carpark where Manning was known to take her clients.

There were numerous people of interest, specifically men who lived in Christchurch and regularly used prostitutes. The police dismissed the theory that the murder had been a robbery gone wrong as her handbag with all her belongings was still over her shoulder when she was discovered. After examining security footage from around the time of her disappearance, police were looking for an Indian man who may have been a client of hers and the driver of a blue four-wheel drive. Police said they wanted to speak with the occupants of a dark four-wheel drive seen at about 11 pm on the night she disappeared near where her body was found.

In January 2009 police announced that grass seeds were found on the cardigan Manning was wearing, suggesting numerous places at which the murder could have taken place. In October 2009 a man who had lived with Manning was approached by police to identify a voice, which he recognised as a person in the "criminal underworld". Other persons of interest included a man in a singlet with brown curly hair, two men standing by a four-wheel drive and the driver of a white saloon vehicle, all seen on the night of her disappearance within metres of where her body was found. Several other murder cases were considered for links with Manning's, but no links were established. One of these cases was the February 2010 murder of Vanessa Pickering (who knew Manning personally).

In December 2010 it was announced that the location where Manning was murdered had been identified due to the seeds found on her clothes; it was a property on Galbraith Avenue in Avonside, close to where the body had been dumped in the river. A warehouse at the site was a Mongrel Mob hangout at the time and they were known to work prostitutes; however it was not ruled out that the property could have been accessed by others as well. In September 2011 it was announced police had discovered semen on Manning's body that was not matched to any of her partners that night. Despite the fact she was possibly sexually assaulted, the police did not rule out the possibility Manning had an unknown sexual partner or client. It was announced they were focusing the investigation on gang members as a result of the discovery of her death site.

The wrongful conviction of Mauha Fawcett
On 29 March 2012, police arrested unemployed 24-year-old Mauha Huatahi Fawcett and charged him with the murder and kidnapping of Manning. Police said he was not linked to the semen sample found on Manning's body, but that he was living in Christchurch at the time and had links to the Galbraith Avenue property. He was a suspect early in the investigation and was convicted on the basis of a coerced confession he made during numerous intense police interviews.  Altogether police interviewed him eleven times over a three year period. His story about what happened changed constantly as he denied being involved. His lawyer, Chris Stevenson said Fawcett made a “bewildering array of incomprehensible statements during his police interviews". He was subsequently diagnosed with fetal alcohol syndrome disorder (FASD). Neuropsychologist Valerie McGinn concluded that Fawcett "suffered significant memory impairment, and when he couldn’t remember, he was prone to making up something". She described Fawcett as a “disabled young man”, and said his condition meant he would “fall for every ploy utilised by the police as they interviewed him over prolonged periods on multiple occasions”.

Fawcett's trial began in the High Court on 7 February 2014 and was expected to last 6 weeks. Fawcett carried out his own defense and claimed police had coerced him into making a confession. In March 2014, a jury of 6 men and 6 women found Fawcett guilty of murdering Manning. In May, Fawcett was sentenced to life imprisonment with possibility of parole after 20 years. Police acknowledged that Fawcett's sentencing was not the end of the investigation as other gang members were involved in Manning's death. A person of interest labelled "Male B" has not yet been identified but is likely connected to Fawcett and the murder.

On 7 August 2017, the Court of Appeal quashed Fawcett's conviction and ordered a retrial. The reasons for the appeal were not publicly disclosed at the time to preserve the right to a fair trial. It was later revealed that the appeal was upheld on two grounds. Fawcett's amicus curiae lawyer, who had assisted him in his own defence, had put on defences that were inconsistent with Fawcett's blanket denial of involvement. In addition the Court of Appeal heard expert testimony that Fawcett met the criteria to be diagnosed with foetal alcohol spectrum disorder, which had not been put before the High Court. The Court of Appeal ruled that had this evidence been available during his trial, it might have led to his interviews and admissions of guilty being ruled inadmissible or dismissed by the jury.

In September 2021, High Court Justice Rachel Dunningham ruled Fawcett's statements inadmissible in a new trial as his foetal alcohol spectrum disorder "makes him an unreliable historian even when he is endeavouring to tell the truth". This led to the Crown agreeing to drop the murder charge and on 26 October 2021, Dunningham dismissed the case. Although the Crown had asked for it to be withdrawn under section 146 of the Criminal Procedure Act allowing them to relay the charge in the event of new evidence; this was rejected by the court. The dismissal means Fawcett can only be retried with leave of the Court of Appeal.

References

1981 births
2008 deaths
New Zealand murder victims
People convicted of robbery
People murdered in New Zealand
December 2008 crimes
New Zealand prostitutes
2008 murders in New Zealand
Crime in Christchurch
Overturned convictions in New Zealand
Unsolved murders in New Zealand